Ilaro is a town in Ogun State, Nigeria. Ilaro town houses about 57,850 people. Ilaro is the headquarters of the Yewa South Local government, now known as YEWALAND which replaced the Egbado division of the former Western State, and later became a part of Ogun State of Nigeria. Ilaro town is about 50 km from Abeokuta, the Ogun State capital, and about 100 km from Ikeja, the capital city of Lagos State.

Close to this monument is the town hall named after the honourable warrior "Orona Hall", whose statue is nearby.

Osata was an Ancient Ilaro ruler in the 19th century who sacrificed his own son for his people to enjoy abundance of rainfall at a time Ilaro was plagued with drought. The dialect spoken in Ilaro is the Egbado dialect. When Ilaro indigenes meets outside home, the shout of “Omo Oluwewun” has a magical power of unifying the "Ilu Aro" people.

Agriculture and Industry 
In the past the major occupation of the Yewa/Egbado people was mostly farming of arable crops and cash crops like cocoa, coffee, kola nuts, oranges, and pineapples. Other farm products included Cassava, yam, okra, rice, bananas, plantains, water leaf, and spinach. Mineral resources found in Ilaro include Phosphate and limestone. The Ilaro soils are mostly loamy and humus, rich in manure and elements that support the growth of cocoa, cashew, pawpaw, kola nut, maize, sugarcane, and potatoes at plantation and mechanized levels.

Due to a very thick forest, the major industry of the Ilaro people is the timber industry. There are several timber milling industries spread at the outskirts of the town for the production of planks and plywood for both local consumption and exportation.

Industries in Ilaro town include the local fufu and gari processing industries, the timber/plank making industries the local Aso Oke weaving industry, paint industry and cement industry located some few kilometers from the Ilaro town a few minutes walking distance from the Ibese town.

History 
Ilaro was founded in the 18th century by Aro who migrated from the Oyo town to settle down in Igbo Aje, a little hill situated at the centre of the town from where he and his warriors could sight enemies (mostly slave traders from the neighbouring Benin republic known then as Dahomey) on attack from a long distance. Aro himself was a warrior and a hunter to be reckoned with. Ilaro had her name from "Ilu Aro" meaning the settlement of Aro which later became Ilaro for ease of pronunciation. Ancient Ilaro town was blessed with great farmers, hunters and warriors out of which Orona and Osata ranked the files of Ilaro history.

In the history laid by these humble kinsmen and peace-loving individuals, apart from saving the lives of their kinsmen from the hands of the invading Dahome and other warriors, news had it that Orona with his "Ekun" (Leopard) when he became old and wanted to show the potency of His powers entered into the ground and told his people to call upon him whenever there is problem, i.e. in times of war, by just pulling the chain attached to himself and the leopard as at the time of entering the ground. This place where Orona disappeared into the ground with his Leopard is today known as the Orona Shrine and has been renovated and constructed as an emolument for lovers of history and tourists. It is also the location where the coronation of every new traditional ruler of the town is performed. The Orona Ilaro Festival is celebrated annually in remembrance of the great warrior.

During the Nigerian Civil War, Ilaro acted as the headquarters of the Egbado land and produced brave warriors who fought for the sustenance of the unity of the Federal Republic of Nigeria. Notable of these patriots include late Major General Olurin (Rtd), late brigadier general Samuel Adegoriola Oniyide, late Major Onifade and the Late Major Ibikunle Armstrong.

Apart from warriors, the Ilaro town also produced renowned Yoruba literature guru Prof. Afolabi Olabimitan who later became a politician few years before his death and was also a delegate to the Nigerian Constitutional conference in 1999.

He authored Kekere Ekun, this being his first novel published in 1967. He also authored “Ta lo p’omo Oba?" and other literatures. Until his death he was a member of the “Akomolede Yoruba" group and a former Don at the University of Lagos, Nigeria.

The aforementioned people contributed in part to the development of Ilaro town as either moralist worthy of emulation, educators, devoters of religion, principal of secondary schools in Ilaro, former sole administrators / governors, former speaker of the Ogun state house of assembly, Minister of State for Education, secretary to the Yewa south local government, Philanthropists, Senior Advocate of Nigeria, gubernatorial candidate, member of the house of assembly, as the case may be. Also apart from these people there are also indigenes of Ilaro that are spread all over cities and other towns in Nigeria and as well as around the world in Europe, in the United States of America, in Asia, in various islands and some countries in Africa such as Ivory Coast, Ghana, Libya, Senegal, Cameroon, Niger Republic and the neighbouring Republic of Benin.

In addition, there are different Iga (Compounds) and communities associated with indigenes of Ilaro that give every individual a point reference to the exact compound or community where he / she originated from within the town. Examples are Iga Ekerin, Iga Badagunro, Iga Babaolu, Iga Saatun, Iga Papa-nla, Iga Modeolu, Iga basasin, Iga sawo, Ile-Eeleri, Ile-Olooja-meje, Iga keeke, Ita Alaran, Ilu-Ata, Oju-okeke, oju-Alumuwa, Oju-Obe, Oke-Ibese. Oju-Omofe, Oju oronna, Ona otun, Ona-Osi, Ona-Ola, Isale Idomo, Ile marun, Oju Yewa, Iga elemo. etc.

Ilaro town had a very good romance with the missionaries from Europe in the 19th and the 20th centuries. History has it that the likes of the Late Lord Lugard, Late Mary Slessor visited the Ancient Ilaro town. Many missionaries lived the whole of their lives as Chaplains and as medical doctors in Ilaro town and in remembrance of this, the longest street in Ilaro to date is named Leslie Street after J. Leslie.

Culture 
The Ilaro people have a very rich cultural heritage. The Ilaro people are the originator of the “Bolojo“ and the “Gelede” dance. The language of communication at the Gelede dances is songs known as “EFE” which is mostly composed to expose and correct the ills done by people in the neighbourhood. One wouldn't know that one is being noticed at every bad steps one took until a visit to a Bolojo dance performance or the Gelede dance stand when specific songs will be composed and rendered to one's hearing.

Listen to the EFE and you will have the cause to laugh out the stress as well as sorrows out of your life. The Adebowale and Atolagbe family of Ona - Otun and the Isale Idiroko compounds of Ilaro are known for the carvings of the Masks and the breast plates (In general the costumes for the Gelede dance performance). The Bolojo dance are usually held at the Oronna hall or at venues for annual occasions such as the independence anniversary, children's day celebrations etc.

The Gelede dances are usually held in the market square and usually during the summer time to enable each and every one both, young and old indigenes of Ilaro to participate. Ilaro festivals include The Egungun Masquerade festival, which in most cases usually last for three months with almost a daily dance and magic performance at the Egungun play ground in the “Ago Ishaga “ area of Ilaro town., the Oro Festival, the Ogun festival, the Sango festival, the Elegbara, the Alamuwa, the Iya Ala festival, the Igbala festival and the Igunuko festival.

The Orona Ilaro festival is however the most significant for its attraction of culture and tourism enthusiasts to the town. The festival usually includes such events as the Sisi Ilaro beauty pageant, a football match, masquerade displays and festival dances, a talent hunt and lots more.

A popular promoter of the Yoruba culture in the movie industry popularly known as "Ogogo" was born and bred in Ilaro. Ilaro indigenes have as part of their appellation "Ogogo 'kulodo", "Ogogo T'alujofe", "'Omo Eribigbo Oyo Mako- tracing the history back to the Oyo town" etc.

Rivers such as the "Odo Ela", "Odo Ogburu", "Odo Yewa" and "Odo Oniru" are major rivers in Ilaro. Others are Odo Iran, Odo Ponpola, and Odo Ontede. The rivers serves a twofold purpose of grazing and watering the rich farmlands of the Yewa/Egbado people and is also dammed to produce potable drinking water to the entire inhabitants of Ilaro. The Ilaro people have their farmlands located in: Oke Ela, Igbo Igbin, Oteyi, Gbokoto, Abobado, Apakoso, Ona Egbo, Olorunda, Igbeji, Igbogun, Iwoye, Olute, Igbo Adaaro, Ebute Igbo Iro, Oke Ibese, Iweke, Igbo ewe, Ijado, Ilobi, Eredo, Olorulekan, to mention but a few.

A visit to Ilaro will not be complete without the taste of "Idobesi Apara" and "Oso". The ancient Ilaro people welcomes visitors as well as their sons and daughters in foreign lands back home with Apara, Oso and Eko. To the Ilaro people the kola and the bitter kolas are meant for occasions such as the worship of Ogun (Kola), Child naming ceremony (Orogbo). Elder family members are usually called "Ogboni". Thus it is usual of Ilaro people to say "Ba mi ki Ogboni e O.", meaning "extend my greetings to your dad" (or the leader of your family). The Ilaro family is mostly extended in nature. The old / ancient part of the town still have these extended families housed, fenced and named as Iga.

Thus it is popular in Ilaro to have compounds named as; Iga Adebari, Iga Bada, Iga Keke, Iga Babaolu, Iga Ekerin, Iga 'Modeolu etc. Of note is the fact that these extended families have specific / unique emblems for recognition as either character, art and craft, trade, chieftaincy title or eligibility to the Ilaro Kingship (heirs to the throne).

Presently Ilaro is a mixed religion town. There are as many numbers of mosques as there are churches. There are also Muslim Missionary training centers of the Ahmadiyat Muslim Mission and the Nawar-ud- deen Missions respectively.

The Missionaries introduced religion and western education to the people of Yewa Land. Churches and schools were founded of which the Christ Missionary Church and school was founded as CMS and the first secondary school in Egbado land known then as Egbado College Ilaro, now Yewa College was also founded.

Neighbouring Towns to Ilaro

The following towns are neighbouring towns to Ilaro; they include : Ajilete, Oke-Odan, Owode, Ibese, Oja Odan, Pahayi, Idogo-Ipaja, Papa-Alanto, and Imasayi.

Politics 
There is a State High Court and Magistrate Courts located in the town.

Climate 
The daily temperature in Ilaro ranges between an average minimum of 23 °C to a maximum of 34.2 °C.

Education 
Ilaro contains schools where pre-primary, primary, secondary and tertiary education can be obtained. Higher institutions of learning include: The Egbado Teachers Training College, Ilaro, and the Federal Polytechnic Ilaro www.federalpolyilaro.edu.ng, founded in September, 1979. There are several privately owned pre-primary education and kindergarten school located and spread within the Ilaro town. In addition to Federal Polytechnic, Ilaro also has the Polytechnic Staff Primary and Secondary schools.

Infrastructure 
Means of transportation is primarily by road. However, there is a locomotive railway line linking the town to Lagos and Abeokuta via Ifo junction and also to the terminus of the Lagos Ifo rail trunk line “Idogo”.

Communication with the outside world form Ilaro town is through mobile telephones and land phones through the +234 8083.., +2348084...., +2348082.... +2348085.... +234 039 4 area codes. Internet access is possible either through private link ups with major internet service providers from Lagos and Abeokuta or through commercial browsing centers located in the town square, on Leslie road, at the Orita Pahayi and The Federal Polytechnic campus.

Ilaro is the site of the Olu of Ilaro who also doubles as the Paramount Ruler of Yewa land. The incumbent paramount ruler is his Royal Highness Oba Kehinde Gbadewole Olugbenle, who ascended the throne on 14 April 2012. Oba Kehinde Gbadewole Olugbenle was selected as the Paramount Ruler of The Yewaland by His Excellency, The Governor of Ogun State, Gov. Ibikunle Amosun, exactly four years after the demise of Oba Samuel Adekanmbi Tella II, who ascended to the throne of Obaship in 1976 after the demise of The Late Oba Adetona Amerika. The Olu Ijana of Ijana town, The Oni Igbeji of Igbeji town, Oloja of Oja Odan, The Oni Idogo of Idogo Ipaja, Oni Iwoye of Iwoye town, Olu of Eredo, Olowode of Owode, Olu of Imasayi, Baale of Iweke and other traditional rulers in Yewa Land are some of the kings in Yewa land which His royal highness, the incumbent Olu of Ilaro, Oba Kehinde Gbadewole Olugbenle (Agunloye IV) rules over.

Social amenities in Ilaro town include: government-owned and privately owned hospitals, government-owned dispensaries, public libraries, electrical plants, water works and road networks linking the town with other towns and even neighbouring country, Republic of Benin. There are quite a number of hotels of quality spread over the town. In January, 2009, Governor Gbenga Daniel commissioned the Ilaro International stadium. The stadium is capable of hosting international and national sports competitions.

The Ilaro town has several banks which serve the needs of individuals, farmers and businesses.

See also 
 Ilaro Court
 Barbados
 Ilaro Stadium

References 

Populated places in Ogun State
Towns in Yorubaland